14 The Shambles is an historic building in the English city of York, North Yorkshire. Grade II* listed, part of the structure dates to the early 19th century, but also features parts of an earlier structure. An alteration and extension was made in the 20th century.

As of 2020, the building was occupied by The Early Grey Tea Rooms.

References 

14
Houses in North Yorkshire
Buildings and structures in North Yorkshire
15th-century establishments in England
Grade II* listed buildings in York
Grade II* listed houses
19th century in York